Nehalem Bay is a bay formed by the confluence of the Nehalem River with the Pacific Ocean in northern Oregon, United States.

The city of Nehalem (pop. 271 in 2010) is situated on US Highway 101 north of Garibaldi and south of Cannon Beach.

West of the bay, Nehalem Bay State Park is located on the sandspit separating the bay from the ocean, where elk, coyotes, and several species of birds live. The park has a long beach, where centuries-old Spanish shipwrecks can be found. The park has campsites open all year and yurts, as well.

References

External links

Bays of Oregon
Oregon Coast
Bodies of water of Tillamook County, Oregon